New Hiesha Natural Reserve is a protected reserve in Libya.

References

Protected areas of Libya